The SO36 club is a music club on Oranienstraße near Heinrichplatz in the area of Kreuzberg in Berlin, Germany.

It takes its name from the historic postcode of that area, SO36, in which the SO stands for Südost (South East). The Kreuzberg district has historically been home to the Berlin punk rock movement, as well as other alternative subcultures in Germany.

History

Since the 1970s SO36 has been a major venue for "alternative" music and culture. Many Punk greats have performed and still perform here. Martin Kippenberger took over the management in 1979, focusing on creating a crossover between Punk and other genres and mediums such as New Wave and the visual arts. SO36 has been compared to New York's CBGB as one of the finest new-wave venues in the world.  However unlike CBGB the venue still stands as of March 2023, and remains a fixture on the Berlin music scene championing new artists, while staying true to its Punk roots. In 2016, the club released SO36: 1978 bis heute ("1978 through today"), a retrospective illustrated book covering the 36-year history of the club, for €36.

Notable cultural connections
English rock band Killing Joke named a song $.O.36 on their eponymous first album, but it is unclear if the song was based on the postal code or the club. The Electric Ballroom held at the club is considered a legendary fixture of the Berlin techno gay scene. Gayhane founded 1997 by Turkish performer Fatma Souad is the nucleus of the Berlin Turkish gay and lesbian community. DJ Ipek, an internationally known DJ and performer at the club, is responsible for the Gayhane mixture of Arabic, Turkish and Indian music. German photographer Nicolaus Schmidt created both a documentary and fictitious portrait of the club, called an "amalgam of western and oriental culture".

References

External links

  
 SO36 in Exberliner Magazine
 Lonely Planet guide to SO36
 Gayhane portraits
 1979 Martin Kippenberger Poster, Tate Modern
 1982 SO36 hosting Berlin Atonal festival photo by Peter Lind

Music in Berlin
Buildings and structures in Friedrichshain-Kreuzberg
Punk rock venues
Nightclubs in Berlin
Infoshops